Guozhou or Guo Prefecture (果州) was a zhou (prefecture) in imperial China, centering on modern Nanchong, Sichuan, China. It existed (intermittently) from 621 until 1227. Between 771 and 775 it was known as Chongzhou or Chong Prefecture (充州).

Geography
The administrative region of Guozhou in the Tang dynasty is in modern northeastern Sichuan. It probably includes parts of modern: 
Under the administration of Nanchong:
Nanchong
Peng'an County
Yingshan County
Xichong County
Under the administration of Guang'an:
Yuechi County

References
 

Prefectures of the Tang dynasty
Prefectures of the Song dynasty
Prefectures of Later Tang
Prefectures of Later Shu
Prefectures of Former Shu
Former prefectures in Sichuan